Joo Hyong-jun (Hangul: 주형준, ; born 22 April 1991) is a South Korean speed skater.

Career

Short track career
In 2010, Joo was selected for the South Korean junior national short track speed skating team and won the gold medal in the men's 3000 metre relay at the 2010 World Junior Short Track Speed Skating Championships held in Taipei, alongside Noh Jin-kyu and Park Se-yeong.

Long track career
In late 2010, Joo turned to long track speed skating. In November 2011, Joo was selected for the South Korean national team and had three podium finishes as a member of the South Korean team pursuit squad in the 2011–12 World Cup series. Joo captured silver in the team pursuit race at the 2013 World Single Distance Championships held in Sochi, alongside Olympic champion Lee Seung-hoon and Kim Cheol-min. Joo also achieved four podiums, including a silver in the mass start race, in the 2012–13 World Cup series.

2014 Winter Olympics
At the 2014 Winter Olympics in Sochi, Russia, Joo first competed on February 15, 2014 in the 1500 metres. In the 1500 m, Joo finished 29th at 1:48.59.

The South Korean pursuit team for the 2014 Olympics consisted of Joo, Lee Seung-hoon and Kim Cheol-min. South Korea eliminated Russia in the quarterfinal, which advanced them to face reigning Olympic Champion Canada in the semifinal. South Korea then beat the Canadian team by 2.96 seconds, with a final time of 3:42.32. The South Korean team eventually won the silver medal, defeated by the Netherlands in the gold medal final by 3.14 seconds, with a final time of 3:40.85.

Records

Personal records (long track)

References

External links
 Profile from 2014 Olympic Games official website

1991 births
Living people
South Korean male speed skaters
South Korean male short track speed skaters
Olympic speed skaters of South Korea
Olympic silver medalists for South Korea
Olympic medalists in speed skating
Speed skaters at the 2014 Winter Olympics
Speed skaters at the 2018 Winter Olympics
Medalists at the 2014 Winter Olympics
Universiade medalists in speed skating
Asian Games medalists in speed skating
Speed skaters at the 2017 Asian Winter Games
Asian Games gold medalists for South Korea
Medalists at the 2017 Asian Winter Games
Universiade medalists in short track speed skating
Universiade gold medalists for South Korea
Universiade bronze medalists for South Korea
Competitors at the 2013 Winter Universiade
21st-century South Korean people